Duo: The True Story of a Gifted Child with Down Syndrome is a 1996 independent film produced and directed by Alexandre Ginnsz, starring his 12-year-old brother Stephane Ginnsz. It is notable for featuring one of the first lead actors with Down syndrome in film history.

Awards

Following the DVD release in 2005:
 Featured Guest at the National Down Syndrome Congress Convention (2005)
 Featured Guest at the New York Sprouts International Film Festival (2005)

References

External links
The official Duo film site
Star of Duo Stephane Ginnsz' Official Site
A. G. Productions
Duo DVD on Amazon

1996 films
Down syndrome in film
American independent films
1990s American films